Boston Corner is a hamlet of the town of Ancram in Columbia County, New York, United States and the town of Northeast in Dutchess County. The District of Boston Corner was incorporated by Massachusetts in 1838 from a tract of unincorporated land west of the town of Mount Washington, Massachusetts, and was ceded from Massachusetts to New York on January 11, 1855, because its geographical isolation from the rest of Massachusetts made maintaining law and order difficult.

Three railroads—New York Central's Harlem Line, the Poughkeepsie and Eastern Railway, and the Rhinebeck and Connecticut Railroad—once served the hamlet. All lines have since been abandoned.
See Boston Corners station

History

1878 description

Note, that although the above description implies the Morrissey/Sullivan fight (and resulting riot) was a primary cause for the annexation; those events actually took place on October 12, 1853, twelve weeks after the cession was agreed to by both states but more than a year before Congress made the transfer official.

References

External links

The Battle of Boston Corners

Hamlets in New York (state)
North East, New York
Hamlets in Columbia County, New York
Hamlets in Dutchess County, New York
Border irregularities of the United States
1855 establishments in New York (state)